Frederico José Oliveira Figueiredo (born 25 May 1991) is a Portuguese cyclist, who currently rides for UCI Continental team .

Major results

2012
 1st Gran Premio Ciudad de Vigo II
2013
 1st Mountains classification Vuelta a la Comunidad de Madrid Sub 23
 2nd Overall Tour of Galicia
 3rd Road race, National Under-23 Road Championships
2014
 7th Overall Volta ao Alentejo
 8th Overall Vuelta a Castilla y León
 9th Overall Troféu Joaquim Agostinho
2015
 9th Overall Route du Sud
2016
 10th Overall GP Beiras e Serra da Estrela
 10th GP Miguel Induráin
2017
 3rd Overall Troféu Joaquim Agostinho
 5th Overall Vuelta a Castilla y León
 5th Road race, National Road Championships
 8th Clássica da Arrábida
 9th Clássica Aldeias do Xisto
 10th Overall GP Beiras e Serra da Estrela
2018
 5th Overall Volta a Portugal
 7th Overall Vuelta a Aragón
 7th Overall Troféu Joaquim Agostinho
 7th Clássica Aldeias do Xisto
 9th Road race, Mediterranean Games
2019
 4th Road race, National Road Championships
 4th Overall Troféu Joaquim Agostinho
 5th Overall GP Beiras e Serra da Estrela
2020
 1st  Overall Troféu Joaquim Agostinho
1st Stage 2
 3rd Overall Volta a Portugal
2021
 1st  Overall Troféu Joaquim Agostinho
1st Points classification
1st Stage 1
 5th Overall Volta a Portugal
1st Stage 4
 10th Clássica da Arrábida
2022
 1st  Overall Troféu Joaquim Agostinho
1st  Mountains classification
1st  Points classification
1st Stage 3
 2nd Overall Volta a Portugal
1st  Mountains classification
1st Stage 5

References

External links

1991 births
Living people
Portuguese male cyclists
Competitors at the 2018 Mediterranean Games
Mediterranean Games competitors for Portugal